Bender Arena is a 4,500-seat multi-purpose arena in Washington, D.C. The arena opened in 1988. It is home to the American University Eagles basketball, volleyball and wrestling teams.

The arena, named for Washington, D.C. philanthropists, Howard and Sondra Bender, is also the primary campus venue for concerts, commencement and speakers, seating up to 6,000.

The arena's main court is named for the late former American University athletic director and coach Stafford H. "Pop" Cassell, another AU alum.  Bender Arena's current main scoreboard, installed prior to the 2001–02 season, includes a  animation and video display and advertising signage for corporate sponsors. At the same time new chairback seating for the west bleachers was installed and new back-lit scorers tables surrounding the playing surface were added.

Bender Arena is the flagship facility of the American University Sports Center, which also includes a fitness center, wrestling room, the Reeves Aquatic Center, a mini-mall, the campus store, and a 470-car, seven-level parking garage.

The  building is adjacent to the Mary Graydon Center, a design intended to increase campus interaction. AU students are able to go to class, have dinner, attend a game or concert and stop by the Tavern or The Eagles Nest convenience store for refreshments without ever leaving the confines of the building. In addition, the facility houses the athletics department and health and fitness offices.  Both buildings virtually mark the geographic center of the American University campus.

Bender hosted the 2002, 2008, and 2009 Patriot League men's basketball tournament final and 2012 National Wrestling Coaches Association All-Star Classic. The American University gymnastics club team uses the wrestling room in the fitness center. The arena has also played host to many concerts, including Pearl Jam in November 1991 opening for the Red Hot Chili Peppers and Phish, who played Bender Arena during their New Year's run in 1993.

See also
 List of NCAA Division I basketball arenas

References

External links
 Bender Arena

American Eagles
College basketball venues in the United States
College volleyball venues in the United States
College wrestling venues in the United States
American Eagles men's basketball
American Eagles women's basketball
American Eagles women's volleyball
American Eagles wrestling
Basketball venues in Washington, D.C.
Gymnastics venues in Washington, D.C.
Swimming venues in Washington, D.C.
Volleyball venues in Washington, D.C.
Wrestling venues in Washington, D.C.
Sports venues completed in 1988
1988 establishments in Washington, D.C.